Afia Kobi Ampem Senior High School (formerly Trabuom Secondary School and Atwimaman Secondary School) is an all female high school in Trabuom in the Ashanti Region

History
The school was established on 27 October 1975 as Trabuom Secondary School and later Atwimaman Secondary School. The school was changed to a female school and its name changed to Afia Kobi Ampem Senior High School in the 2002/2003 academic year. The school is noted for academic excellence, good morals and most of all, discipline.  It also has an idyllic and serene campus. Afua Kobi is one of the best girls senior high school in Ghana. The school can boast of experienced, erudite and pedagogically savvy tutors like Mr Francis Nyimbo, Mr  Eric Osei, Mrs Felicia Morrison, Mr Obed Owoahene Acheampong, Mr Samuel K.Ampofo and Mr Collins Ampong the Head of Department, Languages, Mr Daniel Opoku(Omega), Mr Kelvin Boakye, Mr Avosse of the Department of Science, Mr Eric Osei Owusu, Mr George Agbo of the General Art Department, Mr Bede Abawiere and Mr Charles Odame who is the Head of Department, Mathematics, just to mention  a few. 3

References

High schools in Ghana
Educational institutions established in 1975
1975 establishments in Ghana